Hydnum albidum, commonly known as the white hedgehog, is an edible species of fungus in the family Hydnaceae native to North America.

References

Cantharellales
Edible fungi
Fungi described in 1887
Fungi of North America
albidum